Adolphus Frederick III (7 June 1686 – 11 December 1752) was a Duke of Mecklenburg-Strelitz.

Biography
He was born in Strelitz the son of Adolphus Frederick II, Duke of Mecklenburg, and his wife Princess Maria of Mecklenburg-Güstrow (1659–1701). His father founded the Duchy of Mecklenburg-Strelitz in 1701 after reaching an agreement with the Duke of Mecklenburg-Schwerin.

He succeeded his father as Duke of Mecklenburg-Strelitz on 12 May 1708. In 1712 the ducal family’s castle and the town of Strelitz burnt down. Because of this Adolphus Frederick and his family were forced to live in their hunting lodge. Around this place the new town of Neustrelitz was constructed. In 1733 he founded the new city, which became the official capital of Mecklenburg-Strelitz in 1736.

Adolphus Frederick died at Neustrelitz and was succeeded as Duke by his nephew Adolphus Frederick IV.

Marriage and children

Adolphus Frederick was married to Princess Dorothea of Schleswig-Holstein-Sonderburg-Plön (daughter of John Adolphus, Duke of Schleswig-Holstein-Sonderburg-Plön) on 16 April 1709 at Reinfeld. They had two children:

Duchess Marie Sofia (1710–1728)
Duchess Madalena Cristina (1711–1713)

References

External links

 

1686 births
1752 deaths
Dukes of Mecklenburg-Strelitz
House of Mecklenburg-Strelitz
People from Neustrelitz